The third series of Glow Up: Britain's Next Make-Up Star began on 20 April 2021 on BBC Three. The series was hosted by Maya Jama, and was judged by industry professionals Dominic Skinner and Val Garland.

Contestants

Contestant progress
{|class="wikitable" border="2" style="text-align:center;font-size:96%"
!Contestant
!1
!2
!3
!4
!5
!6
!7
! colspan="2"|8
|-
|Sophie
|SAFE
| SAFE
| style="background:royalblue;" |
|SAFE
|SAFE
| style="background:royalblue;" |
| style="background:lightpink;"|BTM2
|SAFE
|style="background:#D4AF37;"|Winner
|-
|Craig
| style="background:navajowhite;" |SAFE
| style="background:royalblue;" |
|SAFE
|SAFE
| style="background:royalblue;" |
|SAFE
|style="background:navajowhite;"|SAFE
|SAFE
|style="background:silver;"|
|-
|Dolli
|SAFE
| SAFE
| style="background:royalblue;" |
| style="background:royalblue;" |
| style="background:tomato;" |BTM2
| style="background:tomato;" |BTM2
|style="background:navajowhite;"|SAFE
|SAFE
|style="background:sienna;"|
|-
|-
|Jack
|SAFE
| SAFE
| style="background:navajowhite;" |SAFE
| SAFE
| SAFE
| SAFE
| style="background:darkgreen;"|
|bgcolor="darkgray" colspan="2"|
|-
|Ryley
| style="background:navajowhite;"|SAFE
| SAFE
| SAFE
| SAFE
| style="background:navajowhite;"|SAFE
| style="background:red;"|ELIM
| colspan="3"  style="background:darkgray;"|
|-
|Samah| style="background:limegreen;"|WIN| style="background:tomato;"|BTM2
| SAFE
| style="background:tomato;"|BTM2
|style="background: #ff4d8b;"|ELIM| colspan="5"  style="background:darkgray;"|
|-
|Alex|SAFE
| SAFE
| style="background:tomato;"|BTM2
| style="background:red;"|ELIM | colspan="6"  style="background:darkgray;"|
|-
|Xavi|SAFE
| SAFE
|style="background: #ff4d8b;"|ELIM| colspan="7"  style="background:darkgray;"|
|-
|Elliott|SAFE
| style="background:red;"|ELIM | colspan="8"  style="background:darkgray;"|
|-
|Nic|style="background: #ff4d8b;"|ELIM'| colspan="9" style="background:darkgray;"|
|-
|}

  The contestant won Glow Up.
 The contestant was a runner-up.
 The contestant came in third place.
 The contestant won the challenge.
 The contestant was originally in the red chair but later declared safe.
 The contestant was originally safe but later up for elimination.
 The contestant was in the red chair and still eligible for elimination.
 The contestant won the challenge but was up for elimination, but not eliminated.
 The contestant was originally safe but later up for elimination and was then further eliminated.
 The contestant won the challenge but was eliminated.
 The contestant decided to leave the competition.
 The contestant was eliminated.

Face offs

 The contestant was eliminated after their first time in the face off.
 The contestant was eliminated after their second time in the face off.
 The contestant was eliminated after their fourth time in the face off.
 The contestant won the final face off and became Britain’s Next Make Up Star.

Guest judges
 Ateh Jewel, beauty journalist and diversity campaigner
 Sherri Laurence, make-up department head on Pose Les Child, choreographer
 Cate Hall, lead hair and make-up designer on The Crown Abby Roberts, social media influencer
 Vanessa Spence, ASOS design director
 Loz Schiavo, make-up designer on Peaky Blinders''
 Rankin, photographer and director
 Jonas Blue, DJ and music producer
 Lisa Eldridge, makeup artist

Episodes

References

2021 British television seasons